Mariano Florencio Mina Orobio (born March 3, 1979) is an Ecuadorian footballer who plays as a center back for the top level Ecuadorian club Emelec.

Career
He started his career in several lower division teams before being signed in 2004 by then first division club Aucas, however he never played one match with Aucas which gave it away on loan for 2 seasons to Barcelona.

Success in Barcelona avoided him and he was transferred on a free to Macará where he stayed for 2 seasons and then he was signed by Deportivo Cuenca where he played very well, this attracted the interest of Ecuadorian giants Emelec, which signed the player at the end of 2008. He immediately established himself as a first team regular and won his first cap for the Ecuadorian National Squad.

References

External links
Mariano Mina at BDFA.ar

1979 births
Living people
Sportspeople from Esmeraldas, Ecuador
Association football central defenders
Ecuadorian footballers
Ecuador international footballers
Barcelona S.C. footballers
C.S.D. Macará footballers
C.D. Cuenca footballers
C.S. Emelec footballers
S.D. Quito footballers
C.D. Olmedo footballers
Ecuadorian Serie A players